Thomas Thiesson Kristensen (born 17 January 2002), also known as TK, is a Danish professional footballer who plays as a centre-back for Danish Superliga club AGF.

Club career
Kristensen joined AGF at the age of 11 in 2013 from Galten FS, where he had been since he was five year old. He later spent one season at Vejle Boldklub – in 2017–18 – before returning to AGF again.

In September 2020, Kristensen signed a three-year deal with AGF, which also secured him a promotion to the first team squad from the summer 2021. He made his official debut for AGF on 16 May 2021 in a Danish Superliga game against Nordsjælland. Kristensen made a total of three appearances in the 2020–21 season. In June 2021, he was awarded the Martin Jørgensen Talent Award: an award named after AGF legend Martin Jørgensen.

After five appearances and one goal in the first half of the 2021–22 season, Kristensen signed a new contract until December 2026 with AGF on 1 December 2021.

Personal life
Kristensen is the younger brother of Danish goalkeeper, Kasper Kristensen.

References

External links

Thomas Thiesson Kristensen at DBU

2002 births
Living people
Danish men's footballers
Association football defenders
Denmark youth international footballers
Danish Superliga players
Aarhus Gymnastikforening players
Vejle Boldklub players